Mount Heyburn, at  is one of the many  peaks in the Sawtooth Range of central Idaho. Mount Heyburn is located in Custer County and within the Sawtooth Wilderness portion of the Sawtooth National Recreation Area. Grand Mogul, and Mount Heyburn are the two signature peaks that frame the southwest end of Redfish Lake; all are in the Salmon River watershed.

Redfish Lake and Little Redfish Lake and the visitor services at these locations are only a few miles north of Mount Heyburn. The drop-off point at the south end is a campground at the base of Mount Heyburn. The best time to climb Mount Heyburn is in the summer (July, August, or September);  all routes to up Mount Heyburn are class 5.

Mount Heyburn was named for Weldon Heyburn, a U.S. Senator from Idaho from 1903 until his death in 1912.

Images

See also

 List of peaks of the Sawtooth Range (Idaho)
 List of mountains of Idaho
 List of mountain peaks of Idaho
 List of mountain ranges in Idaho

References

External links 
 Peak Bagger - Mount Heyburn
 Summit Post - Mount Heyburn
 
 Sawtooth National Forest - Official Site

Heyburn
Hayburn
Sawtooth National Forest